"One Day" is a song by Dublin-based alternative rock quartet Kodaline. The song was released as a digital download on 2014, as the fifth single from their debut studio album In a Perfect World (2013).

Music video
A music video to accompany the release of "One Day" was first released onto YouTube on 27 January 2014 at a total length of three minutes and forty-six seconds.

Track listing

Chart performance

Weekly charts

Release history

References

Kodaline songs
2012 songs
B-Unique Records singles